PH 75 was a military development program in France aimed at designing a nuclear-powered amphibious assault ship during the 1970s.  Design work was never completed by the time the project was cancelled in 1981.

History
The role of providing air support for amphibious operations in the French Navy was left to the aging Arromanches (R 95), a World War II-era light carrier.  PH 75 was envisioned as the replacement for the Arromanches.  Nuclear propulsion was selected to allow the vessel to operate with fewer support vessels and at longer ranges.  Other roles were added to the program including command, rescue, and anti-submarine warfare.  Early plans were for completion of the first unit by 1981, but this proved unobtainable, and after several delays, the project was finally cancelled.

France instead chose to pursue a conventionally powered vessel to fulfill this role, termed a power projection ship, resulting in the development of the Mistral class which entered service in 2005.  Meanwhile, France also developed a nuclear-powered aircraft carrier, the Charles de Gaulle.

See also
 Mistral-class amphibious assault ship
 List of aircraft carriers

References

Proposed aircraft carriers
Amphibious warfare vessel classes
Helicopter carrier classes
Amphibious warfare vessels of France
Aircraft carriers of France
Abandoned military projects of France
1981 disestablishments in France